Arabbuna is a Palestinian village in the West Bank governorate of Jenin. The village is located 9km north of the city of Jenin, south of the West Bank separation barrier and according to the Palestinian Central Bureau of Statistics (PCBS) in 2016 it had a population of 1,007. Prehistoric flint tools from the Upper and Middle Paleolithic period were found south of the village. Archaeological remains from the Byzantine era were found in the village. It is offered as the location of settlement called "Araba", mentioned by Eusebius in the 4th century CE.

Geography
Arabbuna is located 3 km northwest of Faqqua and 2 km northeast of Deir Ghazaleh. The village houses are situated on a hill at the foot of Mount Faqqua, a section of Mount Gilboa (known as Mount Gibborim in Hebrew), bordered on the west by the Huhit river, on the west by Wadi Abu Jabir, on the north by Mount Faqqua and on the south by a rivulet of Wadi Abi Jabir.

History

Archeology 
Archeologists have found flint tools south of Arabbuna. These tools dated to the Upper Paleolithic and Middle Paleolithic periods (300,000 to 10,000 years BP). The tools from the former belong to the Mousterian culture. The village itself is situated on an ancient site. Old stones have been reused in buildings, fences and walls of terraces. Rock cuttings are scattered between houses and orchards. Some of these are identified as ancient tombs. Today the residents of Arabbuna use these rock cuttings for storage. A small amount of potsherds and glassware were found in the village and are dated to the Byzantine era. Therefore the village may be the location of a settlement known as "Araba" which existed in the time of Eusebius from the 4th century CE.

Ottoman era
It had a population of 14 households, all Muslim. They paid a  fixed tax rate of 25 % on agricultural products, including wheat, barley, summer crops,  goats and beehives, in addition to  occasional revenues; a total of  4,500 akçe. 

In 1838 it was noted as a place N 60° E of Jenin.

In 1870 Victor Guérin   found Arabbuna to be  a small village, and further "south of this village, the foundation of an ancient building, which he does not appear to have examined."

British Mandate era
In the 1922 census of Palestine, conducted by the British Mandate authorities, the village had a population of 136 Muslims, increasing slightly in the 1931 census  to 138 Muslims, in 24 households. 

In the 1944/5 statistics, the population was 210, all Muslim, with a total of 6,772  dunams of land, according to an official land and population survey. Of this, 256 dunams were used for  plantations and irrigable land, 3,607 dunams for cereals, while 22 dunams were built-up (urban) land.

Jordanian era
After the 1948 Arab–Israeli War and the 1949 Armistice Agreements, Arabbuna  came under Jordanian rule.

In 1961, the population was  298.

Post-1967
Since the Six-Day War in 1967, Arabbuna has been under Israeli occupation. The population of 'Arrabuna in the 1967 census conducted by  Israel was 270, of whom 42  originated from the Israeli territory.

References

Bibliography

External links 
 Welcome To 'Arabbuna
Arabuna, Welcome to Palestine
Survey of Western Palestine, Map 9: IAA,  Wikimedia commons

Villages in the West Bank
Jenin Governorate
Municipalities of the State of Palestine